New Hope Primitive Baptist Church, also known as New Hope Church, is a historic Primitive Baptist church located near Richmond, Ray County, Missouri.  The church was established c. 1820 as North Bluffton and the building was constructed in 1897. It is a one-story, rectangular, vernacular Greek Revival style frame building.  It measures 30 feet by 40 feet and has a high gable roof.  Adjacent to the church is a contributing cemetery containing 166 graves dating from 1856 to 1973.

It was listed on the National Register of Historic Places in 1980.

References

External links
 
 

Baptist churches in Missouri
Churches on the National Register of Historic Places in Missouri
Cemeteries on the National Register of Historic Places in Missouri
Greek Revival church buildings in Missouri
Churches completed in 1897
Buildings and structures in Ray County, Missouri
National Register of Historic Places in Ray County, Missouri